Sakeni may refer to one of the following entities:

Sakeni (village), a village in Georgia
Sakeni (river), a river in Georgia
Sakeni Church, an Eastern Orthodox church in Sakeni village, Georgia